Antonietta Fricci (born Antonie Frietsche) (8 January 1840 – 7 September 1912) was an Austrian-born opera singer known for her performances in leading soprano and mezzo-soprano roles in the opera houses of Europe. She was married to the Italian tenor Pietro Neri-Baraldi from 1863 until his death in 1902.

Roles created
Lidia in Pacini's Lidia di Bruxelles (Teatro Comunale, Bologna, 21 October 1858)
Isabella in Pedrotti's Isabella d'Aragona (Teatro Vittorio Emanuele, Turin, 7 February 1859)
Aldona in Ponchielli's I lituani (La Scala, Milan, 7 March 1874)
Mirza in Coronaro's La creola (Teatro Comunale, Bologna, 24 November 1878)

References

Austrian operatic sopranos
Austrian operatic mezzo-sopranos
1840 births
1912 deaths
19th-century Austrian women opera singers